Sergeant Elijah A. Briggs (October 26, 1843 – March 10, 1922) was an American soldier who fought in the American Civil War. Briggs received the country's highest award for bravery during combat, the Medal of Honor, for his action at Petersburg, Virginia on 3 April 1865. He was honored with the award on 10 May 1865.

Biography
Briggs was born on October 26, 1843, in Salisbury, Connecticut, and raised in Lime Rock, Connecticut. He enlisted into the 2nd Connecticut Heavy Artillery on July 18, 1862, at 17 years old. On June 12, 1864, he was wounded by a gunshot to the forehead on the final day of the Battle of Cold Harbor and was incapacitated for several weeks. Although his official Medal of Honor citation cites his capture of a Confederate battle flag during the Siege of Petersburg, he is also credited with capturing a flag during the Battle of Sailor's Creek.

Briggs was honorably discharged at the end of the war and returned to Lime Rock before relocating to Beacon, New York. On June 24, 1874, he married H. Elizabeth Montfort with whom he had one daughter. Briggs was a member of the Grand Army of the Republic, Independent Order of Odd Fellows and the local Methodist Episcopal Church. He died on March 10, 1922, and his remains are interred at Fishkill Rural Cemetery in Fishkill, New York.

Medal of Honor citation

See also

List of American Civil War Medal of Honor recipients: A–F

References

1843 births
1922 deaths
American Civil War recipients of the Medal of Honor
People from Salisbury, Connecticut
People of Connecticut in the American Civil War
Union Army officers
United States Army Medal of Honor recipients